Sinatra Sings Great Songs From Great Britain is an album by Frank Sinatra, arranged by Robert Farnon, recorded in London in June 1962 at CTS Studios by Eric Tomlinson, a renowned recording and film industry dubbing engineer, who would go on to record the soundtracks to dozens of feature films including Oliver! (1968), Fiddler on the Roof (1971), and the original Star Wars trilogy (1977; 1980; 1983).

It is Sinatra's only UK studio album, though there were three other radio performances that were recorded and later released.

Sinatra was tired after touring, and had a sore throat: he was apparently not very happy with his voice.

It was released on LP in Great Britain, but not in the United States. It was released in the US on compact disc in the early 1990s. All tracks were available on The Complete Reprise Studio Recordings.

Track listing
"The Very Thought of You" (Ray Noble) – 3:31
"We'll Gather Lilacs in the Spring" (Ivor Novello) – 3:11
"If I Had You" (Jimmy Campbell, Reginald Connelly, Ted Shapiro) – 4:05
"Now Is the Hour" (Maewa Kaihan, Clement Scott, Dorothy Stewart) – 2:48
"The Gypsy" (Billy Reid) – 3:18
"A Nightingale Sang in Berkeley Square" (Eric Maschwitz, Manning Sherwin) – 3:52
"A Garden in the Rain" (James Dyrenforth, Carroll Gibbons) – 3:22
"London by Night" (Carroll Coates) – 3:17
"We'll Meet Again" (Hughie Charles, Ross Parker) – 3:42
"I'll Follow My Secret Heart" (Noël Coward) – 3:16

Additional track not included on original release, first released in Japan on LP in 1985, and later on CD worldwide:
"Roses of Picardy" (Frederic E. Weatherly, Haydn Wood) – 3:01

Personnel
 Frank Sinatra - Vocals
 Robert Farnon - Arranger, Conductor

Notes
Sinatra recorded the album, a collection of all British material, in June 1962, towards the end of a long tour raising money for children's charities that had started back in April, and included performances in Tokyo, Hong Kong, Tel Aviv, Rome, Athens, Milan. It was the only studio album he recorded outside of the United States. It was recorded at CTS Studios, at its original Bayswater location. Sinatra spent three nights there, working on the tracks for the recording.

Sinatra had made his first visit to the UK in the summer of 1950, when he topped the bill at the London Palladium, and enjoyed playing in Britain. When he toured the UK in 1953, at venues that ran from Tooting Granada to Blackpool Opera House, his star had been fading, but the time of this recording, he was a record label owner (Reprise),
no longer recording for Capitol.

References

Further reading
 Hunter, Nigel (June 23, 1962). "This Was an Evening I'll Never Forget; Nigel Hunter Attends a Sinatra Recording Session". Disc. p. 4.

Frank Sinatra albums
Albums arranged by Robert Farnon
Reprise Records albums
1962 albums
Albums conducted by Robert Farnon
Orchestral jazz albums